Rose is a river which flows through North Rhine-Westphalia, Germany. It is a tributary of the river, Brachtpe.

See also
List of rivers of North Rhine-Westphalia

Rivers of North Rhine-Westphalia
Rivers of Germany